William H. Greene (born January 16, 1951) is an American economist. He is the Robert Stansky Professor of Economics and Statistics at Stern School of Business at New York University.

In 1972, Greene graduated with a Bachelor of Science in business administration from Ohio State University. He also earned a master's degree (1974) and a Ph.D. (1976) in econometrics from the University of Wisconsin–Madison.

Before accepting his position in NYU, Greene worked as a consultant for the Civil Aeronautics Board in Washington, D.C.

Greene is the author of a popular graduate-level econometrics textbook: Econometric Analysis, which has run to 8th edition . He is the founding editor-in-chief of Foundations and Trends in Econometrics journal.

Selected publications

See also 
 LIMDEP

References

External links 
 Website at New York University

1951 births
Living people
21st-century American economists
Microeconometricians
Ohio State University Fisher College of Business alumni
University of Wisconsin–Madison College of Letters and Science alumni
New York University faculty